Zapata is a station on Line 3 and Line 12 of the Mexico City Metro, in the Benito Juárez borough of Mexico City. The station logo depicts Emiliano Zapata, a national hero from the Mexican Revolution of 1910–1921.

The station serves the Colonia Del Valle and Santa Cruz Atoyac neighborhoods in Benito Juárez. It is located at the intersection of Universidad, Zapata, Municipio Libre, Félix Cuevas and Heriberto Frías.

Metro lines
The station serves both lines as a transfer station and as the northwestern terminus of Line 12.  This station used to be the terminus of Line 3; while the line has since been extended south, it still plays an important role in the transportation of the city's inhabitants. The metro station was opened on 25 August 1980. The Line 12 station was opened on 30 October 2012 as a part of the first stretch of Line 12 between Mixcoac and Tláhuac.

Bus services
Metro Zapata transfers to trolleybus Line "D", which runs between Metro Mixcoac (Line 7, Line 12) and the San Andrés Tetepilco neighbourhood.

Above the station is a microbus base, for a recently built large commercial district a few blocks away, with malls, grocery stores, price clubs, cinemas and restaurants.

Nearby
Newspaper Reforma headquarters.

Exits
East: Avenida Universidad and Eje 7 Sur Félix Cuevas, Santa Cruz Atoyac
Northwest: Avenida Universidad, Santa Cruz Atoyac
Southwest: Heriberto Frías street and Eje 7 Sur Félix Cuevas, Colonia del Valle

Ridership

Gallery

References

External links 
 

Zapata
Railway stations opened in 1980
Railway stations opened in 2012
1980 establishments in Mexico
2012 establishments in Mexico
Mexico City Metro stations in Benito Juárez, Mexico City
Mexico City Metro Line 12 stations
Accessible Mexico City Metro stations